Stenotarsus russatus, is a species of handsome fungus beetle found in India and Sri Lanka.

Description
Antenna dark, stout, and gradually thickened. The series of punctures are less regular and coarse. Raised thoracic margin with distinctly flat surface and concave margins.

References 

Endomychidae
Insects of Sri Lanka
Insects described in 1874